Marcus Vinicius Urban Toledo dos Reis (born July 10, 1986) is a Brazilian / Spanish professional basketball player for Valls of the Liga EBA.

Honours and awards 
Ford Burgos

 LEB Oro: 1
 2013

Plus Pujol Lleida

 LEB Catalan League Champion: 2
 2007, 2008

L'Hospitalet

 LEB Plata Champions: 1
 2005

Brazil

 FIBA South American Championship Gold Medal: 1
 2006
 Pan American Games Gold Medal: 2
 2007, 2015

References

External links
 FIBA Profile
 LatinBasket.com Profile
 Spanish League Profile 

1986 births
Living people
Associação de Basquete Cearense players
Basketball players at the 2015 Pan American Games
Bàsquet Manresa players
Brazilian emigrants to Spain
Brazilian expatriate basketball people in Spain
Brazilian men's basketball players
CB L'Hospitalet players
CB Tarragona players
Esporte Clube Pinheiros basketball players
Força Lleida CE players
Liga ACB players
Naturalised citizens of Spain
Novo Basquete Brasil players
Pan American Games gold medalists for Brazil
Pan American Games medalists in basketball
Power forwards (basketball)
Spanish men's basketball players
Medalists at the 2015 Pan American Games
Sportspeople from São Paulo (state)